Melocactus deinacanthus, also known as the Wonderfully Bristled Turk's-Cap Cactus is a species of plant in the family Cactaceae. It is endemic to Brazil.  Its natural habitat is rocky areas. It is threatened by habitat loss.

References

Flora of Brazil
deinacanthus
Critically endangered plants
Taxonomy articles created by Polbot